Quicksilver Messenger Service is an American psychedelic rock band formed in 1965 in San Francisco. The band achieved wide popularity in the San Francisco Bay Area and, through their recordings, with psychedelic rock enthusiasts around the globe, and several of their albums ranked in the Top 30 of the Billboard Pop charts. They were part of the new wave of album-oriented bands, achieving renown and popularity despite a lack of success with their singles (only one, "Fresh Air" charted, reaching number 49 in 1970). Though not as commercially successful as contemporaries Jefferson Airplane and the Grateful Dead, Quicksilver was integral to the beginnings of their genre. With their jazz and classical influences and a strong folk background, the band attempted to create an individual, innovative sound. Music historian Colin Larkin wrote: "Of all the bands that came out of the San Francisco area during the late '60s, Quicksilver typified most of the style, attitude and sound of that era."

Member Dino Valenti drew heavily on musical influences he picked up during the folk revival of his formative musical years. The style he developed from these sources is evident in Quicksilver Messenger Service's swing rhythms and twanging guitar sounds. After many years, the band has attempted to re-form despite the deaths of several members. In 2009, original members Gary Duncan and David Freiberg toured as the Quicksilver Messenger Service, using various backing musicians.

History

Formation
There is some confusion as to the real origins of the group. According to John Cipollina:

The next day, Valenti was arrested for possession of marijuana and spent the better part of the next two years in jail. However, Gary Duncan has stated:

Whether or not Quicksilver Messenger Service was what Valenti had in mind, it appears from Duncan's recollections that he had at least talked with Cipollina about forming a band; Cipollina remembered that:

David Freiberg, a folk-guitarist friend of Valenti, was recruited to the group. He had previously been in a band with Paul Kantner and David Crosby but like Cipollina he had been arrested and briefly jailed for marijuana possession and had just been released.  "We were to take care of this guy Freiberg," Cipollina recalled, and though they had never met before, Freiberg was integrated into the group. The band also added Skip Spence on guitar and began to rehearse at Marty Balin's club, the Matrix. Balin, in search of a drummer for the band he was organizing (which became Jefferson Airplane), convinced Spence to switch instruments and groups.

To make up for poaching Spence, Balin suggested that they contact drummer Greg Elmore and guitarist–singer Gary Duncan, who had played together in a group called The Brogues. This new version of the group played its first concert performance in December 1965, playing for the Christmas party of the Committee (improv group). Drummer Greg Elmore and guitarist Jim Murray were added to fill out the original band.

It was a band without a name, Cipollina recalled:

Management
The group's early management was by Ambrose Hollingworth, who became a paraplegic as a result of an automobile crash near Muir Beach, California in 1967. Hollingworth's stewardship, which also included the all-female Ace of Cups, transferred to Ron Polte. Polte was known for going to great lengths to accommodate the needs of his musicians. When perennial studio musician Nicky Hopkins joined the band in 1969, it was the first and only band that officially included him in its performing and recording revenues. Hollingsworth died in 1996, and Polte in 2016.

Early years
Jim Murray left the group not long after they performed at the Monterey International Pop Festival in June 1967. The band began a period of heavy touring on the West Coast of the United States where they built up a solid following and featured on many star-studded bills at the Avalon Ballroom and the Fillmore West. Sound system pioneer, inventor, and engineer (and famous LSD chemist) Owsley Stanley regularly recorded concerts at major San Francisco venues during this period, and his archive includes many Quicksilver Messenger Service live performances from 1966 and 1967, which were released on his Bear Recordings label in 2008 and 2009.

Quicksilver Messenger Service initially held back from committing to a record deal but eventually signed to Capitol Records in late 1967, becoming the last of the top-ranked San Francisco bands to join a major label. Capitol was the only company that had missed out on signing a San Francisco “hippie” band during the first flurry of record company interest and, consequently, Quicksilver Messenger Service was able to negotiate a better deal than many of their peers. At the same time, Capitol signed the Steve Miller Band, with whom Quicksilver Messenger Service had appeared on the movie and soundtrack album Revolution, together with the group Mother Earth.

Quicksilver Messenger Service released their eponymous debut album in 1968. It was followed by Happy Trails, released in early 1969 and largely recorded live at the Fillmore East and the Fillmore West. Like most live albums of the time, Happy Trails made extensive use of studio overdubs, and the last two songs were recorded entirely in the studio, but it has nonetheless been called the most accurate reproduction of the band's acclaimed live performances. Happy Trails was awarded a gold album in the United States.

These albums, which have been hailed as "...two of the best examples of the San Francisco sound at its purest," emphasize extended arrangements and fluid twin-guitar improvisation. Cipollina's highly melodic, individualistic lead guitar style, combined with Gary Duncan's driving minor scale, jazzy guitar playing, resulted in a clear, notable contrast to the heavily amplified and overdriven sound of contemporaries like Cream and Jimi Hendrix. In 2003 Happy Trails was rated at No. 189 in the Rolling Stone Top 500 albums survey, where it was described as "...the definitive live recording of the mid-Sixties San Francisco psychedelic-ballroom experience..." Archetypal Quicksilver Messenger Service songs include the elongated rendition of Bo Diddley's "Who Do You Love?" on Happy Trails.

Duncan left the group not long after the recording of Happy Trails; according to David Freiberg, this was largely because of his escalating problems with opiates and amphetamines. His 'farewell' performances were the studio recordings that ended up on Happy Trails and a final live performance with the band on New Year's Eve 1969. Duncan recalled 18 years later:

Freiberg later recalled that Duncan's departure shook the core of the band: "Duncan was the 'engine' man, it just didn’t WORK without him ... for me. I was really ... I was devastated..."

For their 1969 album Shady Grove, Duncan was replaced by renowned English session keyboardist Nicky Hopkins, who had played on scores of hit albums and singles by acts like the Kinks, the Rolling Stones, the Beatles, the Who, The Jeff Beck Group and Steve Miller. Hopkins' virtuoso piano boogie dominates the album, giving it a unique sound within the Quicksilver catalog.

Dino Valenti rejoins
Gary Duncan and Dino Valenti both returned to Quicksilver Messenger Service at this time, expanding the group to a six-piece. The next two albums, Just for Love and What About Me, were recorded simultaneously in Hawaii. Much of What About Me was recorded at Pacific High Recording in San Francisco, and both albums were mixed at Pacific High.

The band's approach to recording was undisciplined, with Valenti hiring a building without electricity to record in. The finished albums took many hours in the studio because the group had a contract which allowed unlimited studio time with no Capitol producer present unless invited. The producer was only invited to the studio to hear the playing of the finished albums.

The albums are a departure from the group's earlier sound, with Valenti taking over as lead singer and, under the pseudonym of Jesse Oris Farrow, principal songwriter. The records sold relatively well and produced the group's one hit radio single, "Fresh Air." John Cipollina and Nicky Hopkins departed soon after their experiences in Hawaii. Hopkins apparently left during the Hawaii recording sessions, as founding Paul Butterfield Blues Band keyboardist Mark Naftalin takes his place for three cuts on What About Me.

Later years
The band continued with the lineup of Gary Duncan, Greg Elmore, Dino Valenti and David Freiberg until September 1971, when Freiberg was jailed for marijuana possession; he was replaced by Mark Ryan. Following his recent session contributions, Naftalin joined the band in earnest. This lineup recorded two commercially unsuccessful albums (Quicksilver [1971; No. 114] and Comin' Thru [1972; No. 134]) that left the group without a recording contract. Duncan's "Doin' Time in the USA" from the latter album enjoyed a modicum of FM radio play at the time, while the Quicksilver track "Fire Brothers" was later covered by 4AD founder Ivo Watts-Russell's This Mortal Coil on Filigree and Shadow (1986).

Now largely a part-time vehicle for Valenti and Duncan, the group continued to tour sporadically over the next two years, playing a mixture of headlining club dates and arena/stadium support slots for more popular groups such as The James Gang. Naftalin departed the band in 1972 and was replaced by Chuck Steaks. Harold Aceves, formerly a roadie for the band, also joined the band at the same time as a second drummer. Ryan was fired in 1972 after missing a flight; he was replaced by Roger Stanton. Stanton had played with Aceves in a popular Phoenix, Arizona band Poland. Stanton remained with the band until 1974 when he was replaced by Bob Flurie, who was a well-known East Coast virtuoso guitar player. This Quicksilver lineup disbanded in 1975. Aceves, Stanton, and Flurie later backed former Country Joe and the Fish guitarist Barry Melton.

In 1975, Elmore, Duncan, Valenti, Freiberg and Cipollina recorded a reunion album, Solid Silver, on Capitol Records. The album also included contributions from a variety of Bay Area musicians, including former keyboardist Nicky Hopkins, session vocalist Kathi McDonald and Jefferson Starship multi-instrumentalist Pete Sears. Freiberg had initially replaced Marty Balin in Jefferson Airplane following his release from prison in 1972 and remained with the group as they evolved into the mammothly successful Jefferson Starship. Released in November 1975, Solid Silver fared better from a commercial and critical standpoint than the preceding two albums but only managed to peak at No. 89. While Freiberg elected not to rejoin the live group as a result of his Jefferson Starship commitments, Cipollina, keyboardist Michael Lewis and bassist Skip Olsen toured with the returning trio for a handful of concerts in 1975, culminating in an appearance at San Francisco's Winterland Ballroom on December 28. Shortly thereafter, Cipollina departed once again and the remaining quintet continued to tour clubs intermittently until finally dissolving in 1979.

Remnants and reunions
After leaving Quicksilver in October 1970, Cipollina formed Copperhead, which was initially a loose and variable aggregation before coalescing around the less transitory lineup of Cipollina, Gary Philippet (vocals, guitar, and organ), Jim McPherson (vocals, bass, and piano), Pete Sears (bass, piano)(Sears was to leave after a matter of months being replaced in 1972 by longtime Bonnie Raitt bassist James "Hutch" Hutchinson, who appeared on the album and played with the band until its demise), and David Weber (drums). Although Clive Davis was particularly enamored of the group and signed them to a lucrative deal with Columbia Records, their eponymous 1973 debut failed to gain traction in the marketplace despite heavy touring, leading to Columbia refusing to release their second album and hastening their disbandment. Unable to secure a major label contract in the aftermath of the 1975 Quicksilver reunion, Cipollina continued to perform regularly with many other Bay Area acts, including one billed as Thunder and Lightning, a joint venture with Nick Gravenites, who had co-produced Quicksilver's debut, and another billed as Fish and Chips, with Barry Melton; Greg Elmore played drums for the former, Spencer Dryden for the latter, with Peter Albin on bass; various bass players, including Albin and Roger Troy, played with the former.  During the same period, Cipollina became a founding member of the Dinosaurs in 1982 while continuing throughout the 80s to play club gigs with both other bands. In 1974, Cipollina guested with Quicksilver-idolizing Welsh progressive rock group Man, playing with them at their 1974 Winterland concerts and on a subsequent UK tour; these efforts resulted in the 1975 live album Maximum Darkness. He died in 1989 at the age of 45 from complications of emphysema exacerbated by Alpha 1-antitrypsin deficiency. Some of Cipollina's equipment is displayed at the Rock and Roll Hall of Fame.

Hopkins continued his career as a session and touring musician with a variety of acts, including Jefferson Airplane, the Rolling Stones (most notably on Exile on Main St. and the group's ensuing 1972 American tour), the Jerry Garcia Band and Joe Cocker. In the 1980s, he joined the controversial Church of Scientology and credited the organization's Purification Rundown with vanquishing his long struggle with substance abuse. Hopkins died in September 1994 from complications resulting from intestinal surgery related to his lifelong battle with Crohn's disease. Valenti underwent brain surgery for an arteriovenous malformation in the late 1980s; despite suffering from short-term memory loss and struggling with the adverse effects of anti-convulsive medications, he continued to write songs and perform with various Marin County musicians until his sudden death in November 1994.

In 1984 Gary Duncan resurrected the brand as Gary Duncan's Quicksilver and released several albums with a reconstituted lineup, including Peace By Piece in 1986, Shapeshifter Vols. 1 & 2 in 1996, Shapeshifter Vols. 3 & 4 and Strange Trim in 2006. He also issued several live albums and created a website, quicksilvermessengerservice.com. The group also toured as Quicksilver '96, and after that on occasion through the early 2000s, with a lineup of Duncan, Michael Lewis (keyboards), Greg Errico (drums), Bobby Vega (bass), John Bird (guitar), and Tony Menjivar (percussion).

In 2006 Gary Duncan and David Freiberg launched a 40th-anniversary Quicksilver celebration tour as Quicksilver Messenger Service, with Bobby Vega (soon to be replaced by Keith Graves on bass), singer Linda Imperial (Freiberg's wife and contributor to Quicksilver projects before as a backup singer) and Jefferson Starship players Prairie Prince (drums) and Chris Smith (keyboards). Following a series of tours, Duncan left the band in 2009. He was replaced by Peter Harris, and the band continued as David Freiberg's Quicksilver Messenger Service.

Still active as of 2021, they often opened for the reconstituted Jefferson Starship (led by Freiberg and Paul Kantner) until Kantner's death in 2016.  Duncan died at age of 72 on June 29, 2019 in Woodland, California after suffering a seizure and falling into a coma.

Quicksilver Gold, a tribute band, formed in 2002. Members included Dino Valenti's son, Joli Valenti, as well as John Cipollina's brother, Mario Cipollina, and some members of Zero. This band broke up in 2004.

Personnel
Current members
 David Freiberg – bass (1965-1971, 1975), rhythm guitar (2006–present), lead and backing vocals
 Chris Smith − keyboards (2006–present) 
 Linda Imperial − backing and lead vocals (2006–present) 
 Donny Baldwin − drums (2008–present)
 Peter Harris − rhythm and lead guitar, backing and lead vocals (2009–present)  
 Jude Gold − lead and rhythm guitar, backing vocals (2012–present)
 Steve Valverde − bass (2015–present)

Former members
 John Cipollina – lead and rhythm guitar (1965-1971, 1975; died 1989)
 Gary Duncan – rhythm and lead guitar, lead and backing vocals (1965-1969, 1969–1979, 1984–1996, 2006–2009; died 2019)
 Greg Elmore – drums (1965-1979)
 Jim Murray – rhythm guitar, lead and backing vocals (1965-1967; died 2013)
 Nicky Hopkins – keyboards (1969-1971; died 1994)
 Dino Valenti – lead and backing vocals, rhythm guitar (1969-1979; died 1994)
 Mark Naftalin – keyboards (1971-1972)
 Mark Ryan – bass (1971-1972)
 Harold Aceves – drums (1972-1975)
 Chuck Steaks – keyboards (1972-1975)
 Roger Stanton – bass (1972-1974)
 Bob Flurie – bass (1974-1975)
 W. Michael Lewis – keyboards (1975-1979, 1984–1996)
 Skip Olsen – bass (1975-1979)
 Sammy Piazza − drums (1986-1988)
 Bobby Vega − bass (1988-1996, 2006–2007)
 Greg Errico − drums (1988-1996)
 John Bird − rhythm and lead guitar (1988-1996)
 Prairie Prince − drums (2006-2008)
 Keith Graves − bass (2007-2015)

Lineups

Timeline

Discography

Studio and contemporary live albums

Gary Duncan's Quicksilver
Peace By Piece (1986)
Shape Shifter Vols. 1 & 2 (1996) 
Three in the Side (1998) 
Shapeshifter Vols. 3 & 4 (2006) 
Strange Trim (2006) 
Six String Voodoo (2008)

Live albums
Smokin' Sound (1968)
Happy Trails (1969) (Certified Gold-US).
Live at Fieldstone (1997)
Live at the 7th Note (2007)
Live 07 (2008)
Reunion (live at The Sweetwater, Mill Valley, CA, June 7, 2006) (2-CD, 2009)
Maiden of the Cancer Moon (2-LP, 1983)
At the Kabuki Theatre (2-CD, 2007)
Live at the Avalon Ballroom, San Francisco, 9th September 1966 (CD, 2008)
Live at the Avalon Ballroom, San Francisco, 28th October 1966 (CD, 2008)
Live at The Fillmore, San Francisco, 4th February 1967 (2-CD, 2008)
Live at The Fillmore, San Francisco, 6th February 1967 (CD, 2008)
Live at The Carousel Ballroom, San Francisco, 4th April 1968 (2-CD, 2008)
Live at the Quarter Note Lounge, New Orleans, LA, July 1977 (2-CD, 2009)
Live at the Fillmore, June 7, 1968 (CD, 2013)
Live at The Old Mill Tavern - March 29, 1970 (2013)
 Live at the Winterland Ballroom, December 1, 1973 CD (2013) 
 Fillmore Auditorium  -  November 5, 1966 (2014)
 Cowboy On The Run (Live In New York) LP (2015) 
 Live in San Jose - September 1966 (2015)
 Fillmore Auditorium - February 5, 1967 Live (2015) 
 Stony Brook College, New York 1970 Live (2015)
 Live Across America 1967-1977 (2016)
 More Happy Trails 1969 - Live (2016)

CompilationsRevolution (Movie Soundtrack) (1968) with Steve Miller Band and Mother EarthQuicksilver Anthology (2-LPs, 1973)Sons of Mercury 1968-75 (2-CD, 1991)Unreleased Quicksilver Messenger Service - Lost Gold and Silver (2-CD, 1999)Classic Masters (Remastered, 2002)Castles in the Sand'' (Studio Jam 1969/70) (CD, 2009)

Singles
1967 - "Pride of Man" 
1968 - "Dino's Song" (#63)
1968 - "Stand By Me"
1969 - "Holy Moly" 
1969 - "Who Do You Love" (#91)
1969 - "Shady Grove" 
1970 - "Fresh Air" (#49)
1971 - "What About Me" (#100)
1971 - "I Found Love" 
1972 - "Changes"
1975 - "Gypsy Lights"

References

External links

Quicksilver Messenger Service official site
Poster in the Smithsonian, for Quicksilver Messenger Service concert

Acid rock music groups
Musical groups from San Francisco
Psychedelic rock music groups from California
Cleopatra Records artists
Capitol Records artists
Musical groups established in 1965
Musical groups disestablished in 1979
Musical groups reestablished in 2006
Musical groups disestablished in 2019